During the 1902–03 season Hibernian, a football club based in Edinburgh, finished first out of 12 clubs in the Scottish First Division and won their first league title.

Scottish First Division

Final League table

Scottish Cup

See also
List of Hibernian F.C. seasons

References

External links
Hibernian 1902/1903 results and fixtures, Soccerbase

Scottish football championship-winning seasons
Hibernian F.C. seasons
Hibernian